The Whalley-Gardiner, later Whalley-Smythe-Gardiner Baronetcy, of Roch(e) Court in the County of Southampton, was a title in the Baronetage of Great Britain. It was created on 14 January 1783 for John Whalley-Gardiner, Member of Parliament for Westbury, with remainder, failing male issue, to his brothers and their issue male. Born John Whalley, he was the second cousin and heir of Sir William Gardiner, 3rd and last Baronet, of Roche Court (dsp. 1779), and assumed the additional surname of Gardiner on succeeding to the Gardiner and Brocas estates. The second Baronet (brother of the first Baronet) assumed the additional surname of Smythe on succeeding to those estates. The third Baronet was High Sheriff of Hampshire in 1810. The title became extinct on the death of the fourth Baronet in 1868.

Jane Elizabeth Whalley-Smythe-Gardiner, daughter of the second Baronet, was the grandmother of John Jellicoe, 1st Earl Jellicoe. Mary Anna, third daughter of the third Baronet, was the wife of the historian and Royal Navy captain Montagu Burrows.

The fourth and last baronet's only daughter, Mabel Katharina Whalley-Smythe-Gardiner (1863–1892), inherited Roche Court and married (1887) Henry Fielden Rawstorne (same family as Atherton Rawstorne), their younger but surviving daughter, Mabel Dorothy Rawstorne (1889–1936), inherited and in February 1924 married a widower, Sir William De Salis (1858–1939). She left on her death several Whalley-Smythe-Gardiner portraits to George, 2nd Earl Jellicoe, her third cousin.

Whalley-Gardiner, later Whalley-Smythe-Gardiner baronets, of Roche Court (1783)

Sir John Whalley-Gardiner, 1st Baronet (1743–1797), DCL, of Tackley, Oxfordshire
Sir James Whalley-Smythe-Gardiner, 2nd Baronet (1748–1805), A.M., of Clerk-Hill (purchased by his grandfather in 1715), Whalley, Lancashire (sold 1871). Married (1784) (1) Elizabeth Assheton (1761–1785) (of the family of Richard Assheton of Middleton and (2) Jane Master (aunt of Robert Mosley Master).
Sir James Whalley-Smythe-Gardiner, 3rd Baronet (1785–1851), married (1807) Frances (d. 1855) sister of Oswald Mosley, of Rollestone & Bolesworth. 
Sir John Brocas Whalley-Smythe-Gardiner, 4th Baronet (1814–1868), married (1861) Mary Harriet Forrest.

See also

Gardiner baronets

References

Extinct baronetcies in the Baronetage of Great Britain
Baronetcies created with special remainders